Make Up the Breakdown is the debut album by Hot Hot Heat, following the release of the Knock Knock Knock EP. It was released on October 8, 2002. It was ranked the 20th best album of the year on Pitchforks Top 50 Albums of 2002.

Track listing

Personnel 
  Hot Hot Heat            – producer
 Dante DeCaro        – guitar
 Steve Bays              – keyboards, vocals
 Dustin Hawthorne        – bass guitar
 Paul Hawley             – drums
  Craig Aaronson – A&R
 Ed Brooks – mastering
 Jack Endino – producer, engineer, mixing
 John Goodmanson – mixing
 Patrick Hawley
 Tony Kiewel – A&R
 Jesse LeDoux – design
 Brian Tamborello – photography
 Christopher Walla – engineer, mixing

Charts

Album 
Billboard (United States)

Singles 
Billboard (United States)

References 

2002 debut albums
Hot Hot Heat albums
Sub Pop albums
Albums produced by Jack Endino
Art punk albums